Abbey Hill is a civil parish that covers the Two Mile Ash, Kiln Farm, and Wymbush districts of Milton Keynes in Buckinghamshire, England. As the first tier of Local Government, the parish council is responsible for the people, living and working in this area of Milton Keynes.

The Parish was formed in 2008 as part of a revision of parishes of the Borough of Milton Keynes: the districts were previously part of a parish called Bradwell Abbey. It is bounded by Millers Way (H2), the A5, Watling Street (V4), and Dansteed Way (H4).

Districts of the parish

Two Mile Ash

This residential district contains a primary school, a local centre and part of the eponymous Abbey Hill golf course.

Kiln Farm
This is an employment district of light industry and low-intensity warehousing and distribution. It also contains the remainder of the Abbey Hill golf course.

Wymbush
This is another employment district of light industry and low-intensity warehousing and distribution.

Electoral ward (Borough)
The Parish falls within the Bradwell Ward of the Borough of Milton Keynes.

References

External links
 Abbey Hill parish council

Civil parishes in Buckinghamshire